Leo Paul Ribuffo (September 23, 1945 – November 27, 2018) was an American historian. He was Society of the Cincinnati George Washington Distinguished Professor at George Washington University.

Life
Born in Paterson, New Jersey, in 1945, Ribuffo graduated from Rutgers University in 1966 with a B.A. in history and earned a Ph.D. in American Studies from Yale University in 1976.
 
He taught at Yale University from 1970 to 1972 and Bucknell University from 1972 to 1973. He moved to George Washington University in 1973.

He received grants from the American Council of Learned Societies and the National Endowment for the Humanities, served as visiting professor at Fudan University in China, and held the Organization of American Historians-American Studies Association residency in Japan.

He was academic adviser to The World of F. Scott Fitzgerald (NPR), With God on Our Side (PBS-TV) and the documentary film The Life and Times of Hank Greenberg.

Ribuffo was also worked as a specialist abroad for the United States Information Agency (USIA) in Nigeria and the Republic of Korea.

He died on November 27, 2018.

Awards
 1985 Merle Curti Award

Writings

Books
   (reprint Temple University Press, 1988) online edition

Contributions

Essays

References

External links
 
 Ribuffo retrospective at Society for US Intellectual History

1945 births
2018 deaths
Bucknell University faculty
George Washington University faculty
Rutgers University alumni
21st-century American historians
21st-century American male writers
Writers from Paterson, New Jersey
Yale University alumni
Yale University faculty
Historians from New Jersey
American male non-fiction writers
People of the United States Information Agency